Sonia M. Sotomayor High School is a public high school in the Northside Independent School District (NISD) of San Antonio, Texas, United States. The school is named after Supreme Court justice, Sonia Sotomayor. She became the first woman of color, first Hispanic, and first Latina to be appointed to the Supreme Court in 2009.

Sotomayor opened as the twelfth high school campus in the district on August 22, 2022, and is currently the newest NISD campus as of August 27, 2022. The high school is one of the most expensive and largest in NISD, costing the district $131.7 million dollars to build and spanning 75 acres. NISD announced in August 2021 that Sotomayor will open with no senior class, allowing all seniors previously zoned for William H. Taft High School, John Marshall Harlan High School, and Sandra Day O'Connor High School to finish their final year at their respective school.

History 

On August 26, 2022, the Sotomayor Wildcats kicked off their first ever American Football appearance, and fought against the Legacy of Educational Excellence High School (L.E.E) Volunteers.

References

External links
Sotomayor High School website
Northside Independent School District website

High schools in San Antonio
Public high schools in Bexar County, Texas
Northside Independent School District high schools
Educational institutions established in 2022
2022 establishments in Texas